Grifola gargal is a species of polypore fungus in the family Meripilaceae. Found in Chile, it was described as new to science in 1969.

References

Fungi described in 1969
Fungi of Chile
Meripilaceae
Taxa named by Rolf Singer